At the 1908 Summer Olympics, a water polo tournament was contested.

Medal table

Medal summary

Team rosters

Belgium

 Victor Boin
 Herman Donners
 Fernand Feyaerts (captain)
 Oscar Grégoire
 Herman Meyboom
 Albert Michant (goalkeeper)
 Joseph Pletinckx

Great Britain
 George Cornet
 Charles Forsyth
 George Nevinson
 Paul Radmilovic
 Charles Sydney Smith (goalkeeper, captain)
 Thomas Thould
 George Wilkinson

Netherlands
 Bouke Benenga
 Johan Cortlever
 Jan Hulswit
 Eduard Meijer
 Karel Meijer
 Piet Ooms
 Johan Rühl (goalkeeper)

Sweden
 Robert Andersson
 Erik Bergvall
 Pontus Hanson (captain)
 Harald Julin
 Torsten Kumfeldt
 Axel Runström
 Gunnar Wennerström

Results

Matches

First round
There was only one first round match scheduled.  Great Britain, Sweden, and Austria (the last of which had withdrawn) were scheduled to have byes, while Belgium played the Netherlands.

Semifinals
Austria withdrew before the tournament started, leaving Great Britain with a second bye.

Final
Great Britain's first match was against Belgium, who had already won two games in the tournament.

Ranking and statistics

Scoring 

11 players scored during the three games of the tournament, including 5 of Belgium's poloists.  The Belgian captain's 8 goals led the field, and he also gained the distinctions of having scored in each of the three games as well as the single-game high goal count at 6.

References

Sources
 PDF documents in the LA84 Foundation Digital Library:
 Official Report of the 1908 Olympic Games (download, archive) (pp. 359–361)
 Water polo on the Olympedia website
 Water polo at the 1908 Summer Olympics (men's tournament)
 Water polo on the Sports Reference website
 Water polo at the 1908 Summer Games (men's tournament) (archived)

 
1908
1908 Summer Olympics events
Water sports in London
1908 in water polo
1908